John Casimir Kleczka (May 6, 1885April 21, 1959) was a Polish American lawyer, judge, and Republican politician from Milwaukee, Wisconsin.  He was a member of the United States House of Representatives for the 66th and 67th congresses, and was the first Polish American elected to congress.  He later served as a Wisconsin circuit court judge in Milwaukee County for nearly 23 years.

Early life
Born in Milwaukee, Wisconsin, Kleczka attended the parochial schools. He was graduated from Marquette University, Milwaukee, Wisconsin, in 1905. He took postgraduate courses at Catholic University at Washington, D.C., and at the University of Wisconsin–Madison, studying law. He was admitted to the bar in 1909 and commenced practice in Milwaukee.

Political and law career
He served in the Wisconsin State Senate 1909–1913. He served as delegate to the Republican National Convention in 1912. He served as commissioner of the circuit court of Milwaukee County 1914–1918. He was a major judge advocate in the United States Army Reserves after the First World War.

Kleczka was elected as a Republican to the Sixty-sixth and Sixty-seventh congresses (March 4, 1919 – March 4, 1923) as the representative of Wisconsin's 4th congressional district, after taking the Republican nomination away from incumbent William J. Cary, who had been one of 50 representatives who voted against declaring war on Germany. He did not seek renomination in 1922 but returned to the practice of law.

After retirement, Kleczka was elected circuit court judge in 1930 and served until his retirement due to ill health in 1953. He was appointed a conciliation judge and court commissioner by the circuit judges in 1957 and served until his death.

Death
He died in Milwaukee, Wisconsin, April 21, 1959. He was interred in St. Adalbert's Cemetery.

Notes

Sources

1885 births
1959 deaths
American Roman Catholics
Catholic University of America alumni
Wisconsin state court judges
Republican Party Wisconsin state senators
University of Wisconsin Law School alumni
Marquette University alumni
United States Army officers
Military personnel from Wisconsin
United States Army personnel of World War I
American politicians of Polish descent
Polish-American history
Republican Party members of the United States House of Representatives from Wisconsin
20th-century American judges
Politicians from Milwaukee
20th-century American politicians